"Kill Your Heroes" is a song by American alternative rock band Awolnation. It is written by lead singer Aaron Bruno and musician Brian West for the band's debut studio album Megalithic Symphony, where it appears as the eighth track. "Kill Your Heroes" was released as the third and final single from Megalithic Symphony and reached the top 20 of the United States Billboard Alternative Songs and Rock Songs charts.

The song's music video parodies the children's TV series Mister Rogers' Neighborhood. It was also featured on Nintendo Video.

Track listing

Personnel
 Aaron Bruno – lead vocals, rhythm guitar
 Drew Stewart – lead guitar, backing vocals
 Kenny Carkeet – keyboards, backing vocals, rhythm guitar 
 Hayden Scott – drums
 Devin Hoffman – bass, backing vocals

Charts

Weekly charts

Year-end charts

Release history

References

Awolnation songs
2011 songs
2012 singles
Songs written by Brian West (musician)
Red Bull Records singles
Songs written by Aaron Bruno